This article lists notable scat singers by year of birth.  It is also sortable alphabetically.

Groups

See also

 List of jazz musicians

Lists of jazz musicians
Lists of singers